Generations of Winter (in Russian, Московская сага - Moskovskaya Saga) is a novel by the Russian writer Vasily Aksyonov.

Many critics have praised Generations of Winter as a new Doctor Zhivago-style, large-scale Russian novel, which tells the story of a Russian/Georgian family, the Gradovs, struggling to survive in the Stalinist era.

As the Wall Street Journal put it: "Aksyonov has ambitiously set out to challenge Tolstoy on his own ground, creating a gigantic historical novel on the grand pre-revolutionary model."

In late 2004 a television-series based on the novel premiered on Russian television. It has 22 episodes.

Footnotes

References

 The series on DVD, in Russian.

1994 Russian novels
Novels set in Russia
Family saga novels
20th-century Russian novels